The  are a group of islands in Okinawa Prefecture, Japan. They are about 60 km west of Okinawa Island.

They include
 Aguni Village (Shimajiri District)

 Tonaki, Village (Shimajiri District)

References 

Archipelagoes of Japan
Okinawa Islands
Islands of Okinawa Prefecture
Archipelagoes of the Pacific Ocean